Nadaan (translated: innocent) is a 1971 Bollywood drama film directed by Deven Verma. The film stars Asha Parekh, Navin Nischal, Helen and Madan Puri.

Cast
Asha Parekh - Seema
A. K. Hangal - Seema's Father
Brahm Bhardwaj - Ramprasad Jain
Sulochana Chatterjee - Mrs. Sarla Jain
Navin Nischal - Ajay Jain
Helen - Rita Saxena
Praveen Paul - Mrs. Saxena
Madan Puri - Mangu
Nirupa Roy - Ranimaa alias Ranjana
Asit Sen - Bhola Shankar
M. B. Shetty - Gunga Pahelwan
Sunder - Sunder Lal
Deven Verma - Lawyer Vicky
Jairaj - Jailor
Rashid Khan - Balbir Singh's Servant
Ravikant - Birju
Subroto Mahapatra - Seema's Servant
Ratan Gaurang - Blanket Store Employee
Bela Bose
Karan Dewan

Crew
Director - Deven Verma
Screenplay - Deven Verma
Dialogue - Akhtar-Ul-Iman
Producer - Deven Verma
Editor - Subhash Gupta, Khan Zaman Khan
Cinematographer - Anwar Siraj
Art Director - K. Baburao, S. S. Sharma (assistant)
Production Manager - M. Hasan Ali Siddique
Assistant Director - Aijaz Ali, Prem Kamath
Assistant Cameraman - Rohington Behramsha, Clyde Chai-Fa, Parvez M. Irani, Vijay Hangal (stills)
Stuntman - M. B. Shetty, Surendra Shetty, Balram (assistant)
Choreographer - Surya Kumar, Badri Prasad
Original Music - Shankar–Jaikishan
Music Assistant - Sebastian D'Souza, Dattaram Wadkar
Lyricist - Hasrat Jaipuri
Playback Singers - Mukesh, Asha Bhosle

Music

References

External links
 

1971 films
1970s Hindi-language films
1971 drama films
Films directed by Deven Verma